Milford Ross "Cardy" Swartz (1893 – 1978) was a minor league baseball player and an American football, college basketball and college baseball coach.

As an aside, nickname was Carty, shortened from Cart Horse which he got in school due to his strength.  He was my grandfather and lived with my family when I was in school.

He served as the head football coach at the University of Connecticut in 1920.

After playing baseball in the International League, Swartz was hired as the head football coach and head basketball coach at Lycoming College–then known as Dickinson Seminary–in 1923. His football teams achieved a record of 54 wins, 27 losses, and 4 at Dickinson.

Swartz later served as the head football coach (1930–1941) and head men's basketball (1930–1942) at Juniata College in Huntingdon, Pennsylvania.

References

External links

 

1893 births
1978 deaths
Gettysburg Patriots players
Juniata Eagles football coaches
Juniata Eagles men's basketball coaches
Lycoming Warriors football coaches
Lycoming Warriors men's basketball coaches
Lycoming Warriors athletic directors
Newark Bears players
Pittsfield Hillies players
Reading Aces players
Reading Coal Barons players
Reading Marines players
UConn Huskies football coaches
UConn Huskies men's basketball coaches
UConn Huskies baseball coaches